Giannis Mantzaris (born 15 April 1996) is a Greek professional footballer who plays as a goalkeeper for Gamma Ethniki club Paniliakos.

References

1996 births
Living people
Greek footballers
Football League (Greece) players
Super League Greece 2 players
Aris Thessaloniki F.C. players
Apollon Larissa F.C. players
Platanias F.C. players
Kalamata F.C. players
Paniliakos F.C. players
Association football goalkeepers
Footballers from Thessaloniki